Tomáš Vokoun (born 2 July 1976) is a Czech former professional ice hockey goaltender. He played in the National Hockey League (NHL) for the Nashville Predators, after he was originally drafted by the Montreal Canadiens in the ninth round, 226th overall, in the 1994 NHL Entry Draft.

Playing career

Early career (1994–1998) 
Vokoun was drafted by the Montreal Canadiens in the ninth round of the 1994 NHL Entry Draft, 226th overall. He remained in the Czech Republic for another year, playing with Poldi Kladno.

Vokoun moved to North America for the 1995–96 season and played for the Wheeling Thunderbirds of the ECHL. He was called up to the Fredericton Canadiens of the American Hockey League (AHL) and played one playoff game. Having proven himself in the ECHL, Vokoun spent the 1996–97 season in Fredericton and played in his only game for Montreal; it was not a stellar debut, however, as he allowed four goals in only 20 minutes of play against the Philadelphia Flyers.

Nashville Predators (1998–2007) 
After another season with the Fredericton Canadiens, Vokoun was chosen by the Nashville Predators in the 1998 NHL Expansion Draft on 26 June 1998.

Vokoun played 37 games for Nashville in their debut season and played nine games for the Milwaukee Admirals in the International Hockey League (IHL). Although he again split time between the two clubs the following season, by 2000, Vokoun established himself in the NHL, though he initially only saw limited action as the back-up to starter Mike Dunham. In 2002, Dunham was traded to the New York Rangers for Marek Židlický, Tomáš Klouček and Rem Murray, effectively awarding Vokoun the starting job.

Vokoun's play was solid enough in 2003–04 to send him to the All-Star Game for the first time, and his goaltending was a major factor in the Predators' first-ever playoff berth that season. The team lost in six games to the Detroit Red Wings in the first round. In game 4 of that series, played in Nashville, Vokoun earned the first-ever playoff shutout in franchise history, stopping 41 Red Wing shots.

During the 2004–05 NHL lockout, Vokoun played 19 regular season games for HIFK in the Finnish SM-liiga, posting a .940 save percentage. In the playoffs, Vokoun did not perform as well, posting an .846 save percentage in four games, the worst in the league in that year's playoffs.

On 10 April 2006, the Predators announced Vokoun was afflicted by thrombophlebitis of the pelvis, a blood-clotting condition. He missed the team's remaining regular season games and the entire playoffs while he recovered by taking blood-thinning drugs and avoiding physical activity. Back-up goaltender Chris Mason took his place as the starter, but the Predators failed to advance in the playoffs, again losing in the quarter-finals. On 24 July 2006, Vokoun was cleared to resume his career and returned for the 2006–07 NHL season. However, at the beginning of the season, Vokoun injured his thumb during a game and was required to have surgery. Pins were put in this thumb, and he played with the pins and a brace on his thumb.

Florida Panthers (2007–2011) 

On the day of the 2007 NHL Entry Draft, Vokoun was traded to the Florida Panthers in exchange for a first-round selection in the 2008 NHL Entry Draft, a second-round selection in the 2007 draft (58th overall) and a conditional second-round selection in either 2007 or 2008. Vokoun's nine-year tenure in Nashville had him setting many of the Predators' goaltending records, all of which were overtaken by Pekka Rinne in the following decade.

Vokoun was selected to play for the Eastern Conference team in the 2008 NHL All Star Game in Atlanta.

During the 2008–09 NHL season, Vokoun recorded 26 wins for the Panthers as they battled for their first playoff berth since 2000. Although they ultimately fell short, the Panthers' being in position to qualify was due in large part to the goaltending of Vokoun and fellow goaltender Craig Anderson.

Vokoun was injured by teammate Keith Ballard in a game on 30 November 2009, when Ballard hit Vokoun with an errant stick in the head. Vokoun was carried off the ice on a stretcher and was treated at a nearby hospital for an ear laceration. Vokoun had just given up a goal to Ilya Kovalchuk of the Atlanta Thrashers and Ballard went to break his stick on the goal post in frustration, but caught Vokoun instead.

Washington and Pittsburgh (2011–2014) 

Vokoun signed a one-year contract with the Washington Capitals on 2 July 2011 worth $1.5 million. Vokoun had a rough 2011–12 NHL season with the Capitals, as it was plagued by injury and inconsistent performance.

With Washington resorting to youngster Braden Holtby as their starting goaltender, Vokoun was traded to the Pittsburgh Penguins on 4 June 2012 in exchange for a seventh-round pick in the 2012 NHL Entry Draft. The following day, Vokoun signed to a two-year, $4 million contract. Since his customary sweater number 29 was being worn by Marc-André Fleury, Vokoun opted to wear number 92 with the Penguins; he became the first goaltender since Daren Puppa to wear a sweater number from 90 to 98.

On 30 March 2013, Vokoun set a personal best and Pittsburgh Penguins individual franchise record shutout streak of 187:30. He had two consecutive shutouts (on 28 March against the Winnipeg Jets and on 30 March against the New York Islanders) and a combined shutout with Marc-André Fleury on 26 March against the Montreal Canadiens. Vokoun played the third period to complete the shutout after Fleury was injured at the end of the second period. On 9 May 2013, Vokoun made his first playoff start in six seasons, a 31-save shutout against the New York Islanders in Game 5 of the Eastern Conference Quarter-finals.

Vokoun was sidelined indefinitely after undergoing surgery to dissolve another blood clot in his pelvis during the 2013 pre-season. On 21 January 2014, it was reported Vokoun would begin skating in practice again, with no timetable as to his possible return. On 15 December 2014, Vokoun announced his retirement.

International play

Vokoun has represented the Czech Republic many times over the course of his playing career. His first international experience came with the under-20 team at the 1996 World Junior Ice Hockey Championships, where the Czechs finished in fourth place. His first senior experience came at the 2003 IIHF World Championship, where the Czechs again finished in fourth place. Overall, he has played for the Czechs at four IIHF World Championships, two Winter Olympic Games and also in the 2004 World Cup of Hockey. He backstopped the Czechs to a third-place finish at the World Cup, gold medals at the 2005 and 2010 World Championships and won bronze with the team at the 2006 Olympics in Turin.

Personal life
Vokoun lives with his wife, Dagmar, and two daughters, Adelle and Natalie, in Parkland, Florida.

Awards and records
 Runner-up for the NHL Rookie of the Month award for December 1998.
 NHL Player of the Week for the week ending 2 January 2000 (3–0–0, 1 shutout, 1.33 goals against average (GAA), .960 save percentage; he was the first Predator to ever win this award).
 NHL Defensive Player of the Week for the week ending 30 November 2003 (4–0–0, 1.50 GAA, .950 save percentage).
 Selected to play for the Western Conference in the 2004 NHL All-Star Game.
 Selected to play for the Eastern Conference in the 2008 NHL All-Star Game.
 NHL Defensive Player of the Month for January 2010 (NHL's Third Star of the Month, 8–4–2, 1.49 GAA, .956 SV%, 4 SO).

Career statistics

Regular season and playoffs

International

References

External links

 

1976 births
Czech ice hockey goaltenders
Florida Panthers players
Fredericton Canadiens players
Ice hockey players at the 2006 Winter Olympics
Ice hockey players at the 2010 Winter Olympics
Living people
Medalists at the 2006 Winter Olympics
Montreal Canadiens draft picks
Montreal Canadiens players
Nashville Predators players
National Hockey League All-Stars
Olympic bronze medalists for the Czech Republic
Olympic ice hockey players of the Czech Republic
Olympic medalists in ice hockey
Orli Znojmo players
Sportspeople from Karlovy Vary
Pittsburgh Penguins players
Washington Capitals players
Wheeling Nailers players
Wilkes-Barre/Scranton Penguins players
Czech expatriate ice hockey players in the United States
Czech expatriate ice hockey players in Canada
Czech expatriate ice hockey players in Finland